"Love Changes Everything" is a song from the musical Aspects of Love, composed by Andrew Lloyd Webber, with a lyric written by Charles Hart and Don Black. It was first sung in the musical by the character Alex Dillingham, which was originated by Michael Ball in both the London and Broadway casts.  The song was released as a single in 1989, also sung by Ball, and stayed on the UK Singles Chart for 15 weeks, peaking at No. 2 and becoming Ball's signature tune. The song was later featured on Ball's 1992 self-titled debut album and Love Changes Everything: The Collection.

Background
In the prologue to Aspects of Love, a young Englishman, Alex, is lovestruck by a French actress, Rose. This upends his world, and he sings that "Love changes everything ... How you live and / How you die" for better or for worse.  He notes that love "Makes fools of everyone" and concludes that, once love strikes, "Nothing in the / World will ever / Be the same."  Musically, it is a "simple, effective three-chord piano-accompanied anthem". The song became the best-known number from Aspects of Love and it "delivered yet more proof that Andrew Lloyd Webber could deliver soaring, anthemic ballads".

The song was featured at the 44th Tony Awards.

The 2018 compilation album, Andrew Lloyd Webber Unmasked: The Platinum Collection, included a remixed version of the 1989 single recording.

Other versions 
Artists who have covered it include
 Jonathan Antoine
 John Barrowman
 Sarah Brightman 
 Michael Crawford
 Il Divo (with Michael Ball)
 Climie Fisher
 Paul Potts
 G4
 Honeymoon Suite
 Aaron Lines
 Audra McDonald
 Nana Mouskouri
 Opportunity Knocks winner Mark Rattray
 Sting
 Sting and Shaggy
 Anthony Warlow
 Marti Webb
 Hayley Westenra 

The Off-Broadway spoof revue Forbidden Broadway picked up on the bed-hopping aspect of Aspects of Love, changing the song to "We Sleep with Everyone".

Certifications

References

External links
 Video of Michael Ball performing the song from the Really Useful Group 

1989 debut singles
Songs from musicals
Songs with music by Andrew Lloyd Webber
Michael Ball songs
Sarah Brightman songs
Songs with lyrics by Don Black (lyricist)
Il Divo songs
Nana Mouskouri songs
1989 songs
1980s ballads
Pop ballads
Polydor Records singles